Charity is an English feminine given name derived from the English word charity. It was used by the Puritans as a virtue name. An earlier form of the name, Caritas, was an early Christian name in use by Romans.

Charity is also the usual English form of the name of Saint Charity, an early Christian child martyr, who was tortured to death with her sisters Faith and Hope. She is known as Agape in Biblical Greek and as Caritas in Church Latin and her name is translated differently in other languages.

Faith, Hope and Charity, the three theological virtues, are names traditionally given to triplet girls, just as Faith and Hope remain common names for twin girls. One example were the American triplets Faith, Hope and Charity Cardwell, who were born in 1899 in Texas and were recognized in 1994 by the Guinness Book of World Records as the world's longest lived triplets.

Charity has never been as popular a name in the United States as Faith or Hope. It ranked in the top 500 names for American girls between 1880 and 1898 and in the top 1,000 between 1880 and 1927, when it disappeared from the top 1,000 names until it reemerged among the top 1,000 names in 1968 at No. 968. It was most popular between 1973 and 1986, when it ranked among the top 300 names in the United States. It has since declined in popularity and was ranked at No. 852 in 2011.

This is a list of people and characters named Charity:

People
 Charity Anderson (born 2000), American dancer
 Charity Adule (born 1993), Nigerian footballer
 Charity Angya, Nigerian vice chancellor
 Charity Bick (1926–2002), English civilian dispatch rider during the Second World War and youngest ever recipient of the George Medal
 Charity Brown (born 1951), Canadian film actress and singer
 Charity Bryant (1777-1851), American writer
 Charity Kathambi Chepkwony, Kenyan politician
 Charity Clark, American politician
 Charity Wright Cook (1745-1822), American Quaker minister
 Charity Daw, American singer-songwriter
 Charity Elliott (born 1969), American basketball team coach
 Charity Adams Earley (1918-2002), African-American officer
 Charity Gaye Finnestad (born 1973), American author
 Charity Lamb (1818-1879), American murderer
 Charity Mucucuti (born 1983), Zimbabwean rugby union player
 Charity Basaza Mulenga (born 1979), Ugandan electrical engineer
 Charity Nebbe (born 1975), American host
 Charity Ngilu (born 1952), Kenyan politician, Minister of Health from 2003 until 2007 and Minister of Water and Irrigation from 2008 to 2013
 Charity Opara (born 1972), Nigerian former sprinter
 Charity Reuben (born 2000), Nigerian footballer
 Charity Scott (born 1951), American professor
 Charity Shea (born 1983), American actress
 Charity Still (c. 1775-1857), American matriarch
 Charity Taylor (1914-1998), English medical doctor
 Charity Sunshine Tillemann-Dick (1983-2019), American soprano and presenter
 Charity Waciuma (born 1936), Nigerian novelist
 Charity Wakefield (born 1980), English actress
 Charity Wayua (born 1985), Kenyan chemist
 Charity Williams (born 1996), Canadian Olympic athlete
 Charity Zisengwe (born 1997), Zimbabwean inspirational speaker
 Charity Zormelo (1904-1945), Ghanaian first woman graduate from the Gold Coast and first woman from English-speaking West Africa to earn a B.S. degree

Fictional characters
 Charity Bazaar, from the cartoon Histeria!
 Charity Bleak, from Grant Morrison's comics Seven Soldiers: Klarion the Witch-boy
 Charity Burbage, from J.K. Rowling's Harry Potter series
 Charity More, in Claudia Gray's novel Stargazer
 Charity Standish, in the soap opera Passions
 Charity Tate, from the British soap opera Emmerdale
 Charity Hope Valentine, in the musical comedy Sweet Charity and the film adaptation
 Charity Barnum, in the 2017 American musical film The Greatest Showman
 Akura Charity, from Will Wight's Cradle novel series
Charity Kirshenbaum, from Two and a Half Men

References

English feminine given names
Virtue names